The Australian Curriculum, Assessment and Reporting Authority (ACARA) is the independent statutory authority responsible for the development of a national curriculum, a national assessment program, and a national data collection and reporting program that supports learning for Australian students.

ACARA's work is carried out in collaboration with a wide range of stakeholders, including teachers, principals, governments, State and Territory education authorities, professional education associations, community groups and the general public.  It was established in 2008 by an Act of the Australian Federal Parliament. The authority is also responsible for the My School website and NAPLAN testing.

Progress of the development of each learning area is published and updated regularly on the official site.

References

External links
 
 My School website

2008 establishments in Australia
Education in Australia
Educational organisations based in Australia
Organizations established in 2008
Commonwealth Government agencies of Australia